is a 2014 kart racing game developed and published by Nintendo for the Wii U. It retains the gameplay of previous games in the Mario Kart series, with players controlling a Mario franchise character in races around tracks. Tracks are themed around locales from the Super Mario platform series and are populated with power-ups that help players gain advantages in races. Different difficulties are selectable prior to a race; harder difficulties make gameplay faster. In the new anti-gravity sequences, players drive on walls and ceilings. Mario Kart 8 contains a variety of single-player and local and online multiplayer games modes, including Grand Prix racing and arena-based battle modes.

Nintendo revealed Mario Kart 8 in 2013, and released it in May 2014. Both paid and free downloadable content (DLC) were released after its launch, including a further difficulty setting and additional tracks. It was rereleased on the Nintendo Switch in April 2017 as  Deluxe includes all of the original DLC, as well as a revamped battle mode and other gameplay alterations. Nintendo has continued to add downloadable circuits and characters.

Mario Kart 8 was a critical success; reviewers praised its gameplay and presentation, but the battle mode received mixed reviews. Critics praised Deluxe as definitive version of Mario Kart 8 for its improved battle modes and presentation. Both releases have been named by critics as among the best Mario Kart games, and have won and been nominated for several awards. Mario Kart 8 is the one of the best-selling video games of all time, at over 60.46 million sold. It is also the best-selling Wii U game at 8.46 million sold and the best-selling Nintendo Switch game at 52 million.

Gameplay 

Mario Kart 8 is a kart racing game; players control characters from the Mario universe to race in go-karts around a course. They may hinder their opponents or improve their performance using power-ups found in item boxes throughout the course. It includes four different difficulties, each differing in speed, which may be selected before the race. "Mirror Mode" horizontally inverts all courses. Returning features from previous installments include motorbikes and 12-player racing from Mario Kart Wii, as well as hang gliders, underwater racing and vehicle customization from Mario Kart 7. Up to four players can play together on a single system, up to eight can play together through a local wireless connection, and up to twelve can play together via online multiplayer.

The signature new feature of Mario Kart 8 is anti-gravity racing, in which certain parts of a course allow racers to drive on walls and ceilings. In these sections, players who collide with other racers or special bumpers will trigger a speed boost. New characters include the Koopalings and Pink Gold Peach. In addition to karts and motorbikes, the game also includes all-terrain vehicles. There are four new items: the Boomerang Flower, which can be thrown to attack players; the Piranha Plant, which attacks nearby racers and obstacles and provides a speed boost; the Crazy Eight, which gives the user eight different items; and the Super Horn, which can be used both to attack nearby opponents and defend against items, including the previously nearly unavoidable Spiny Shell. The game features 32 courses spread across eight cups, with an additional 16 courses later released as downloadable content (DLC) in four additional cups.

Mario Kart 8 Deluxe 
Mario Kart 8 Deluxe included all downloadable content (DLC) for Mario Kart 8, including characters, courses, and vehicle components, into a single product for Nintendo Switch. These features are accessible upon first starting the game, without the need to be unlocked. In addition to previous DLC, several new characters are introduced in Deluxe, including the Inklings from Splatoon, Bowser Jr., Dry Bones, and King Boo. Other notable changes to the gameplay include the ability to hold two items at once, and accessibility features to assist newer players, such as auto-acceleration or smart steering, which prevents players from veering off course. Deluxe also reintroduces the Boo item, which allows the player to steal another opponent's item and then temporarily become invisible. In Deluxe's "Booster Course Pass", several courses have differing layouts in every lap, condensing multiple variations of a course into one.

The largest addition in Mario Kart 8 Deluxe is the updated battle mode. Deluxe includes five new battle mode-exclusive courses, and three battle courses adapted from previous entries in the Mario Kart series. These battle courses are designed specifically for the mode, featuring layouts that allow for easier item play, rather than repurposing standard race courses like Mario Kart 8. The Feather item, reintroduced from previous entries in the series, is exclusive to this mode and allows the player to get a small boost in height when it is activated. There are five rulesets in battle mode. In Balloon Battle, players use items to destroy each other's balloons. Unlike in previous incarnations, the mode is point-based rather than last-man-standing, meaning that the winner is whoever destroys the most balloons before the match ends. Bob-omb Blast is a variation of Balloon Battle with all the items replaced with bombs. In Shine Thief, players must maintain control of the Shine Sprite for as long as possible; the player or team who possesses it for the longest wins. In Coin Runners, players scavenge coins from around the course and steal them from other players, aiming to have the biggest hoard. The final mode is Renegade Roundup, which involves a team of "renegades" trying to avoid the "authorities" armed with Piranha Plants, which takes inspiration from the children's game "cops and robbers". Renegades may free their captured teammates by driving over switches under the cages controlled by the authorities.

Development and release 

Initially confirmed in a January 2013 Nintendo Direct presentation, Mario Kart 8 was fully unveiled at E3 2013. Some members of Bandai Namco Games received special thanks in the credits. The "8" in the logo was designed to resemble a Möbius strip, as was Mario Circuit, one of the courses. Early in development, the idea of using a drill to penetrate the ground was considered but was quickly discarded for not being as interesting as anti-gravity. Courses were designed with anti-gravity in mind, including tracks from older games which were redesigned to take advantage of the new mechanic. Other courses had gliding and underwater sections added as well.

Nintendo's launch promotions of Mario Kart 8 include a Limited Edition with a Spiny Shell figurine; and special Mario and Luigi themed console bundles, with a hat, strategy guide, Wii Remote Plus controller, Wii Wheel, and GamePad protector. In North America, Europe, and Australia, players who purchased and registered Mario Kart 8 on Club Nintendo before July 31, 2014, received a free download code for a selected Wii U game. As part of a promotional campaign with Mercedes-Benz, Mario, Luigi, and Peach were featured in a series of Japanese commercials for the Mercedes-Benz GLA, and three karts based on past and present Mercedes-Benz vehicles were added as part of a downloadable update on August 27, 2014. In 2014, fast food company McDonald's released Happy Meal-branded toys based on the characters and karts. A soundtrack album containing 68 tracks from the game was made available as an exclusive reward available to Club Nintendo members shortly preceding the service's discontinuation in 2015.

Game updates added new features and user experience improvements, such as support for Amiibo figurines, a 200cc difficulty setting, player statistics, and additional Mii outfits. Two paid DLC packs added characters, vehicles, and courses to the game. Some characters and courses are based on other Nintendo franchises, including Link (The Legend of Zelda), Isabelle and Villager (Animal Crossing), Mute City and Big Blue (F-Zero), and Excitebike Arena (Excitebike), a first for the Mario Kart series.

Mario Kart 8 Deluxe 

After initially being teased alongside the Nintendo Switch's announcement in October 2016, Mario Kart 8 Deluxe was formally revealed at the Nintendo Switch Presentation on January 12, 2017. The trailer showcased mechanics such as Smart Steering and crossover elements from the Splatoon series—additional crossovers with The Legend of Zelda: Breath of the Wild were added in an update post-launch. The release date was set for April 28, 2017, only a month after the Switch's March 3 launch. Nintendo also announced a steering wheel accessory for the Switch Joy-Con controller to allow for motion-controlled steering. An overview trailer revealed details about the game's battle mode including several battle mode-exclusive courses, as well as the return of the Shine Thief mode from Mario Kart: Double Dash. After the release of the trailer, several internet memes circulated surrounding Donkey Kong appearing to perform a celebratory dab. Mario Kart 8 Deluxe revamps the battle mode, adds a second item slot, among other minor gameplay imprvements.

Shortly after launch, Nintendo released a software update that changed one of the victory gestures done by the Inkling Girl. Prior to the update, the Inkling Girl performed a gesture that consisted of placing her hand on a flexed bicep and pumping her fist into the air. In Japan, the gesture means something similar to "bring it on!", though in European and Latin American countries, it was likened to the bras d'honneur, an offensive gesture that can be interpreted as "up your ass", "fuck you", or similar meanings. After the update, the Inkling Girl no longer clenches her fist around her flexed arm, instead simply performing a "fist pump", though the rest of the gesture was unchanged.

A series of updates in 2018 added compatibility with Nintendo Labo, a toys-to-life kit that uses cardboard to create motion-controlled toys with Joy-Con controllers. The first update enabled the Toy-Con Motorbike as a controller for Mario Kart 8 Deluxe, allowing the player to use the physical throttle, handlebars, and gyroscope present on the Toy-Con Motorbike, while actions like braking, drifting, and item pickups are still performed using the standard controller buttons. A later update added compatibility for the Toy-Con Car, Pedal, and Key to control actions like braking, drifting, and using the horn on the steering wheel to launch items.

An update released on December 7, 2022, added an item customization option for certain modes, allowing players to choose which items are obtainable in a race or Battle.

Booster Course Pass 
During a February 2022 Nintendo Direct, it was announced that Mario Kart 8 Deluxe would get a paid downloadable content season pass called the "Booster Course Pass". Courses in the "Booster Course Pass" are largely remastered from their incarnations in previous Mario Kart games. The "Booster Course Pass" is set to release in six waves, with each wave containing eight courses split into two cups, totaling to 48 additional tracks to be released by the end of 2023. It can be accessed by purchasing it on the Nintendo Switch's eShop, or by having an active Nintendo Switch Online + Expansion Pack subscription. The first wave of the "Booster Course Pass" was released on March 18, 2022, containing the Golden Dash Cup and the Lucky Cat Cup. Wave 2 was released on August 4, 2022, containing the Turnip Cup and the Propeller Cup. Wave 2 also included Sky-High Sundae, an original course not introduced in a previous Mario Kart game. Alongside the release of Wave 2, Nintendo released an update to the Wave 1 course Coconut Mall that changed the cars at the end of the course to perform donuts, rather than remaning stationary, except for in Time Trials. This change was widely praised, especially after many were disappointed that the cars were stationary in the "Booster Course Pass" to begin with. Wave 3 was released on December 7, 2022, containing the Rock Cup and the Moon Cup. The ability to remove certain items from "VS Race" mode and online races was also added. Wave 4 was released on March 8, 2023 in North America and March 9 elsewhere, containing the Fruit Cup and the Boomerang Cup. It also features a brand new original course based on Yoshi's Island (1995).

In February 2023, Nintendo announced that future waves will add more playable characters to the game, returning from previous Mario Kart titles. The first of these characters, Birdo, was released in Wave 4.

Reception 

Mario Kart 8 received "generally favorable" reviews, according to review aggregator Metacritic, whereas Deluxe received "universal acclaim". Overall, reviewers held Mario Kart 8 in high esteem among racing games, but considered Deluxe to be the definitive version of the title. Deluxe was further called one of the best games in the Mario Kart series or one of the best racing games of all time. Some reviewers considered the game to be an essential purchase for Nintendo Switch owners. Improvements in Deluxe made certain features of Mario Kart 8 feel worse in retrospect. However, many reviewers criticized the lack of new content in Deluxe compared to Mario Kart 8.

The main racing mode of Mario Kart 8 was widely praised. Eurogamer called it the "most vibrant home console racing game in years". The rubber-banding mechanics present in the game's AI competitors was criticized, though Game Informer noted that "fans accepted that pitfall as a series mainstay long ago". Finding the core racing unchanged, they said Deluxe is still "the same great title from the Wii U". GameSpot and Nintendo Life also considered Deluxe's racing to be as strong as the original. Minor mechanical changes, such as the ability to hold two items, were praised, with many liking how it added more strategy to Deluxe's item play. Accessibility options like smart steering and auto-acceleration received mixed feedback. Many felt that the additions made Deluxe the most accessible Mario Kart game, and others appreciated how they helped less experienced players enjoy the game, despite making the game too easy for veteran players. However, some reviewers disliked how smart steering was enabled by default, and how it could overcorrect or interfere with precision inputs.

The main criticism levied at Mario Kart 8 was its battle mode, which was noticeably worse than previous entries. Easy Allies called it "abysmal", and Kotaku said it was "borderline unplayable". Giant Bomb panned the recycling of existing courses for battle mode, which made it difficult to find opponents to engage with, instead of creating new arenas that are more intentionally designed for this mode. By contrast, Deluxe's revamped battle mode received widespread acclaim. Easy Allies and Kotaku claimed that the new battle mode far outshined the original game, and Pocket Gamer said that Deluxe returned battle mode to its "original arena-battling glory". VentureBeat said that they remedied the issue with the original Mario Kart 8's battle courses. However, Electronic Gaming Monthly said that the battle mode was "not so much a point for Deluxe that these modes are included as it is a retroactive demerit for the original Mario Kart 8". Many critics considered Renegade Roundup to be the best of Deluxe's battle modes, though GameRevolution and USgamer said it was their least favorite.

Reviewers also focused on the graphics and visual style of the game. Eurogamer praised both the vast sense of scale and the "exquisite details" of the courses. Digital Foundry deemed it "near perfection" with "phenomenal attention to detail", featuring a "magnificent visual package" and "magical playability". Their technical analysis attributes the smoothness of motion and overall gameplay to the consistent performance of 60 frames per second (FPS), with the split-screen mode's effective 30 FPS nonetheless comparing favorably with industry standard. Reviewers for Deluxe echoed this praise, with some saying that the graphics of Deluxe were an upgrade from the Wii U original. GamesTM praised the "incredible" lighting of Deluxe, saying that courses like Rainbow Road and Electrodrome stood out as "fantastic showcases for the Nintendo universe and its creative spirit". IGN felt that the "great art direction" in Mario Kart 8 and Deluxe was "a major reason" for the game's graphics remaining "gorgeous". Easy Allies called the soundtrack "something special", saying that both original and returning songs were "fantastic and downright catchy". Eurogamer called the game's soundtrack "outrageously upbeat", and that Deluxe's "defining moment" was the game's live band rendition of Super Mario Kart's main theme.

Booster Course Pass 
Upon announcement, the Booster Course Pass received mixed reception from fans. Many fans disliked that additional content for a previous game was being prioritized over a new entry in the series, citing how it had been nearly eight years since Mario Kart 8 first released on the Wii U. The graphics of the courses in the Booster Course Pass were also a point of contention, with some saying that they fell short of the standards set by Deluxe.

After release, critics were mixed—according to Metacritic, Wave 1 received "mixed or average reviews", and Waves 2 & 3 received "generally favorable reviews". Criticism focused on the graphics, which were lower in detail compared to courses from the main game. Digital Foundry attributed this to the courses being built upon their versions from Mario Kart Tour. On the other hand, many reviewers felt that the courses that originated in Tour were among the best gameplay-wise, and Ninja Hideaway in particular was praised as a highlight of Wave 1. Some courses in Wave 2 were lauded, with Nintendo Life calling Waluigi Pinball's graphics "stunning". Another common disappointment was that many courses did not include Mario Kart 8's signature anti-gravity or underwater features. GameSpot lamented how the Booster Course Pass only introduced new courses, rather than new characters or customization parts. Nintendo Life praised the audio design, calling it "stellar" and "a delight", and Destructoid called Sydney Sprint's soundtrack "the best" music of the Booster Course Pass. The addition of courses that vary every lap was praised by critics, with Nintendo Life wishing it would become a "mainstay" feature of the series.

Accolades 
Readers and staff of Eurogamer voted Mario Kart 8 their game of the year, and GameSpot gave it the award of "Best Wii U Game". It was nominated for "Best Wii U Exclusive" in GameTrailers' 2014 Game of the Year Awards; for "Best Game" in Giant Bomb's 2014 Game of the Year Awards; and for "Overall Game of the Year" and "Wii U Retail Game of the Year" in Nintendo Life Reader Awards 2014, and it won both awards for both categories in their Staff Awards 2014. It won "Game of the Year" by The Guardian. In IGN's Best of 2014 Awards, it was nominated for "Best Multiplayer" and "Best Racing", and won the award for "Best Wii U Game".

Mario Kart 8 Deluxe also earned recognition at year-end awards in the 2017–2018 season. The game was nominated for "Best Switch Game" and "Best Remake/Remaster" in IGN's Best of 2017 Awards. Destructoid nominated the game for its "Best Switch Game" in their Game of the Year Awards in 2017, and the game was awarded "Old Game of the Year" at Giant Bomb's 2017 Game of the Year Awards.

Sales 
In its first four days on sale, Mario Kart 8 became the fastest-selling Wii U game, with more than 1.2 million copies sold worldwide. Within a month, it increased to 2.82 million. As of September 2021, more than 8.46 million copies were sold worldwide, making it the best-selling Wii U game. Based on the sales data, more than half of Wii U owners own a copy. In the United Kingdom, shortly after the release of Mario Kart 8, week-on-week Wii U console sales rose 662%, with Mario Kart 8 bundles accounting for 82% of consoles sold.

Mario Kart 8 Deluxe sold 459,000 copies in the United States on its launch day, making it the fastest-selling entry in the Mario Kart series, ahead of 2008's Mario Kart Wii by 25,000 units. Roughly one year after launch, Deluxe had sold 9.22 million copies. It surpassed Super Mario Odyssey as the best-selling game on the Nintendo Switch in 2019, and Mario Kart Wii as the best-selling Mario Kart game in 2021. Since its release in 2017, Deluxe has been a consistent top-selling game on the Nintendo Switch. , Mario Kart 8 Deluxe has sold 52 million units, making it the best-selling Nintendo Switch game, as well as one of the best-selling games of all time.

Fan response 
"Luigi's death stare" is an Internet meme describing the automatic facial expression displayed by Luigi toward other characters upon attacking or passing them during a race, in which he gives them a disapproving glare in passing. It was featured in several viral videos and animated GIFs, and the phenomenon was covered by WNYW in early June 2014. Nintendo referenced the meme in their E3 2014 digital event. Venture Beat praised Nintendo's handling of the meme, noting that it was a "slick way" of acknowledging fan culture. The meme was nominated for the Best Gaming Moment at the 32nd Golden Joystick Awards.Several mods have been created for Mario Kart 8 and Mario Kart 8 Deluxe. In February 2022, a mod was created that added Kirby's Mouthful Mode car transformation (colloquially known as "Carby") from Kirby and the Forgotten Land as a selectable kart and character. In June 2022, a mod was published that added Green Hill Zone from the Sonic the Hedgehog series as a course.

Notes

References

External links 
 

2014 video games
2017 video games
Crossover racing games
D.I.C.E. Award for Racing Game of the Year winners
The Game Awards winners
8
Mario racing games
Multiplayer and single-player video games
Nintendo Entertainment Analysis and Development games
Nintendo Network games
Nintendo Switch games
Pack-in video games
Split-screen multiplayer games
Video game sequels
Video games developed in Japan
Video games scored by Ryo Nagamatsu
Video games that use Amiibo figurines
Video games with downloadable content
Video games with expansion packs
Wii Wheel games
Wii U eShop games
Wii U games